Rami Rabie (born June 26, 1982) is an Egyptian former footballer, who played as a striker. He is currently the assistant coach of Tanta SC.

References

1982 births
Living people
Egyptian footballers
Al Mokawloon Al Arab SC players
People from Monufia Governorate
Association football forwards
Al Ahly SC players
El Gouna FC players
Eastern Company SC players
Al Ittihad Alexandria Club players
El Minya SC players
Aswan SC players
Egyptian Premier League players